Patrick W. Ford (1847–1900) was an Irish-American architect who, along with Patrick C. Keely of Brooklyn and James Murphy of Providence, Rhode Island designed many Roman Catholic churches built in the eastern part of United States through the latter half of the 19th century.

He was born in Ballincollig, Ireland, and educated at Queen's College Cork, Ford emigrated to the United States in 1866. He briefly lived in New York where he may have worked in the office of Patrick C. Keely, and then went to work for architects E. Boyden & Son in Worcester, Massachusetts.<ref>Leading Manufactures and Merchants of the City of Boston'. Boston: International Publishing, 1885.</ref>

In 1872 Ford moved to Boston and opened his own practice. He was widely recognized as an authority on church architecture and his practice focused primarily on designing churches and institutional buildings for the Roman Catholic Church in New England. His home was at 48 Peter Parley Road in the Jamaica Plain section of Boston. His house had an amazing stained glass window by the artist John Lafarge (now housed in the Corning Glass Museum). Ford died suddenly at age 52 in August 1900.

Works(partial list)''
 Saint Mary's Church, Holliston, Massachusetts
 Sacred Heart Church, Roslindale, Massachusetts
 St. Gregory Church, Dorchester, Massachusetts (1895 redesign of original church by James Murphy)
 Sacred Heart Church, Rectory, School and Convent, Cambridge, Massachusetts
 St. Mary's Church, Dedham, Massachusetts
 St. James Church, Haverhill, Massachusetts
 Gate of Heaven Church, South Boston, Massachusetts
 St. Peter Church, South Boston, Massachusetts
 St. Patrick's Church, Watertown, Massachusetts
 St. Mary Church, Everett, Massachusetts
 St. Brendan Church, Bellingham, Massachusetts
 L'Église Saint Jean Baptiste (St. John the Baptist Church), Lowell, Massachusetts
 St. Augustine Church, Andover, Massachusetts
 St. Mary Church, Winchester, Massachusetts
 St. John the Evangelist Church, Clinton, Massachusetts
 St. Peter's Church, Worcester, MA
 Saint Anselm College, Goffstown, NH
 St. Dominic Church, Portland, ME
 St. Mary of the Assumption Church Northampton, Massachusetts
 St. James Church, New Bedford, MA (altered by Maginnis and Walsh)
 1875 alteration to Fenwick Hall, College of the Holy Cross, Worcester, Massachusetts 
 Sacred Heart of Jesus Church, Worcester, Massachusetts
 Sacred Heart Church, Holyoke, Massachusetts
 Notre Dame Church, Pittsfield, Massachusetts
 All Saints Church, Ware, Massachusetts

No longer extant
 St. Philip's Church, Boston, Massachusetts (burned)
 St. Brigid's Church, Lexington, Massachusetts (burned)
 Immaculate Conception Church, Revere, Massachusetts (demolished)
 St. Anne Church, Worcester, Massachusetts (demolished)
 St. Rose of Lima Church, Northborough, Massachusetts (burned) 
 St. Stephen Church, Framingham, Massachusetts (demolished)
 Our Lady of the Rosary Church, South Boston, Massachusetts (demolished)
 St. Michael Church, Exeter, NH (demolished)

Attributed to Ford
 Our Lady of the Rosary Church, Spencer, Massachusetts

Gallery

References
Notes

External links

1847 births
1900 deaths
19th-century Irish people
Irish emigrants to the United States (before 1923)
Irish architects
American ecclesiastical architects
Gothic Revival architects
Architects of Roman Catholic churches
19th-century American architects